Jawole Willa Jo Zollar (born December 21, 1950) is an American dancer, teacher and choreographer of modern dance. She is the founder of the Urban Bush Women dance company.

Biography
One of six children, she was born Willa Jo Zollar in Kansas City, Missouri, to parents Alfred Zollar Jr. and Dorothy Delores Zollar. From age seven to seventeen, Zollar received her dance education from Joseph Stevenson, former student of Katherine Dunham. Zollar also had early training in Afro-Cuban and other native dance forms which later helped to shape her teaching aesthetic. After high school graduation she went on to receive a Bachelor of Arts in dance from the University of Missouri at Kansas City and from there also received her Master of Fine Arts from Florida State University, where she is currently a tenured dance professor.
In 1980, Zollar moved to New York City, where she studied under Dianne McIntyre, artistic director for Sounds in Motion Dance Company. In 1984, she left the company and established her own, called the Urban Bush Women, which became the first major dance company consisting of all-female African-American dancers.

Movement style and choreography 
Zollar's choreographic style is influenced by the dance traditions of Black Americans—modern dance, African dance, and social dance. Her movement synthesizes influences from modern dance (a combination of Dunham, Graham, Cunningham, and Limón techniques), Afro-Cuban, Haitian, and Congolese dance. She emphasizes the use of weight and fluidity as opposed to creating clean shapes. From her Afro-Cuban dance training she employs a strong sense of dynamic timing, rhythmic patterns, and continuous flow of movement. She derives many of her movement ideas from African-American culture—allowing the "church testifying, emotional energy shap[e] the form, and the rawness of that form, like you have in jazz," she says.

In her choreography, Zollar creates avant-garde dance-theater productions that speak from the black female perspective. Her pieces are collaborative performances between dancers, vocalists, artists, actors, composers and musicians, including vocalizations, a cappella singing, storytelling, and social commentary. Through these mediums, Zollar pushes towards social awareness and change. Zollar also explores African-American folk traditions and the reality of the black woman's experience, tackling uncomfortable and controversial social topics such as abortion, racism, sexism, and homelessness, in a hard-edged and straightforward way. Many dance critics say that Zollar's company makes a point to show the reality of African-American culture, revealing how black Americans express themselves when not in the presence of whites.

List of works 
 1984 River Songs; Life Dance…The Fool's Journey
 1985 Working for Free
 1986 Anarchy, Wild Women and Dinah; Girlfriends; Madness; LifeDance I…The Magician (The Return of She)
 1987 Bitter Tongue
 1988 Heat; Lipstick; Shelter; LifeDance II…The Papess
 1989 I Don’t Know, But I Been Told, If You Keep on Dancin’ You Never Grow Old
 1990 Praise House
 1992 LifeDance III
 1994 Nyabinghi Dreamtime; Vocal Attack
 1995 Batty Moves; BONES AND ASH: A Gilda Story
 1996 Transitions
 1997 Self Portrait
 1998 Hand's Singing Song
 2000 Soul Deep
 2001 HairStories
 2002 Shadow's Child
 2004 Walking with Pearl- Africa Diaries
 2005 Walking with Pearl…Southern Diaries
 2011 visible
 2012 Blood Muscle Bone
 2014 Hep Hep Sweet Sweet
 2014 Walking with 'Trane, Chapter 2

Awards 
 New York Foundation for the Arts fellowship (1984)
 National Endowment for the Arts choreography fellowships (1988–90)
 New York Dance and Performance Award (1992)
 Worlds of Thought Resident Scholar, Makato State University (1993–94)
 Capezio Foundation Dance Award (1994)
 Who's Who in America (1995)
 Regent Lecturer, Department of World Arts and Culture, University of California (1995–96)
 Bessie Award for Walking With Pearl…Southern Diarie (2006)
 Dance Magazine Award (2015)
 MacArthur Fellowship (2021)
 2022: The Lillian and Dorothy Gish Prize

References

External links 
Profile at Urban Bush Women
Faculty profile at Florida State University

Biography at Free to Dance, PBS
Jawole Willa Jo Zollar in Conversation with Ananya Chatterjea, October 21, 2010 at the Institute for Advanced Study, University of Minnesota.

1950 births
Living people
Artists from Kansas City, Missouri
American female dancers
Dancers from Missouri
American choreographers
Florida State University faculty
Bessie Award winners
Modern dancers
American women academics
21st-century American women